Saeed Al-Dossari (born 15 June 1990) is a Saudi Arabian football player who plays as a winger for Al-Shoulla.

References

External links
 

Living people
1990 births
Association football wingers
Saudi Arabian footballers
Al-Shabab FC (Riyadh) players
Al-Taawoun FC players
Al-Hazem F.C. players
Al-Fateh SC players
Al-Kawkab FC players
Al-Orobah FC players
Al-Shoulla FC players
Sportspeople from Riyadh
Saudi Professional League players
Saudi First Division League players